Đorđe Đurić (born 10 August 1991) is a Serbian football player. He plays as a defender.

After 3 seasons in FK Čukarički, On 1 July 2019 Đurić signed for another Serbian SuperLiga club, Vojvodina.

Honours
Vojvodina
Serbian Cup: 2019–20

References

External sources
 
 Đorđe Đurić stats at utakmica.rs
 

Living people
1991 births
Footballers from Belgrade
Serbian footballers
Red Star Belgrade footballers
FK Rad players
FK Spartak Subotica players
FK Rudar Pljevlja players
FK Čukarički players
FK Vojvodina players
Association football defenders
Serbian SuperLiga players
Montenegrin First League players
Serbian expatriate footballers
Serbian expatriate sportspeople in Hungary
Expatriate footballers in Hungary
MTK Budapest FC players
FC Tatabánya players